William Chase Taubman (born November 13, 1941 in New York City) is an American political scientist. His biography of Nikita Khrushchev won the Pulitzer Prize for Biography in 2004 and the National Book Critics Circle Award for Biography in 2003.

He is a graduate of the Bronx High School of Science and received a B.A. from Harvard University in 1962, an M.A. from Columbia University in 1965, a Certificate of the Russian Institute in 1965, and a Ph.D. from Columbia University in 1969.

He is currently Bertrand Snell Professor of Political Science at Amherst College.

Taubman was the recipient of a 2006 Guggenheim fellowship.

Personal life
Taubman is the son of Nora Stern, a teacher, and Howard Taubman, who was chief music critic and then chief theater critic for The New York Times in the 1950s and 60s.

William Taubman is the brother of diplomatic journalist Philip Taubman.

His wife, Jane A. Taubman, was a professor of Russian, Emerita, at Amherst College.

Selected publications

 Gorbachev: His Life and Times (W. W. Norton & Company, 2017), .
 Trump and Putin in Historical Perspective: How We Got into the New Cold War, Amherst College  A talk by William Taubman, the Bertrand Snell Professor of Political Science, Emeritus (June 6, 2017)
 Khrushchev: The Man and His Era (W. W. Norton & Company, 2003), .
 Moscow Spring with Jane Taubman (Summit Books, 1989), .
 Stalin's American Policy: From Entente to Détente to Cold War (W W Norton & Company, 1982), .
Khrushchev on Khrushchev by Sergei Khrushchev, (editor/translator).  (Boston: Little, Brown, 1990)

References

External links
Faculty page at Amherst College

Living people
The Bronx High School of Science alumni
Harvard University alumni
Columbia University alumni
Amherst College faculty
American biographers
21st-century American historians
21st-century American male writers
Pulitzer Prize for Biography or Autobiography winners
1940 births
American male non-fiction writers